Suhaag Raat is a 1968 Hindi-language drama film, produced and directed by R. Bhattacharya under the A.J. Pictures banner. It stars Jeetendra and Rajshree , with music composed by Kalyanji Anandji.

Plot
Rajjo (Rajshree), a daughter of Lala Harsukh Rai (Moni Chatterjee), is in love with Flight Lieutenant Jeetendra, and their marriage is arranged. On the day of the wedding, war is declared, the marriage gets canceled and he goes to combat. He is gravely injured, becomes crippled, and hospitalized. Rajjo's family perishes in aerial bombardment and she re-locates to live with her cousin. Jeetendra does return and is devastated when told that everyone has been killed. A wealthy woman Rani Saheba (Sulochana Latkar) takes pity on him, hires him as Manager, and confides that her son, Thakur Uday Singh (Prakash Thapa), is a womanizer and alcoholic. Jeetendra counsels her to compel him to get married, and he agrees to do so. The marriage is arranged with none other than Rajjo herself, but the duo maintain their silence. On the wedding night, Uday goes to the brothel, gets into a physical altercation with Nawab Ladan, kills him, and goes on the run. Police subsequently find his body, his mother identifies it, and Rajjo becomes a widow. After a few months, the entire community will be shocked and scandalized when they find Rajjo pregnant and refusing to name the male responsible for her plight.

Cast
Jeetendra as Captain Jeetendra / Jeet
Rajshree as Rajjo H. Rai 
Prakash Thapa as Thakur Uday Singh
Mehmood as Juman Bijnori
Chandrakant Gokhale as Pandit
Bipin Gupta
Moni Chatterjee as Lala Harsukh Rai
Dhumal as Parwana
Mehmood Jr. as Banne
Sulochana Latkar as Rani Saheba
Tun Tun as Titli Banu
Shabnam
Madhumati as Qayamat Bai
Neelam	as Chamkili Bai
Laxmi Chhaya as Mohabbat Bai
Mridula Rani as Shanta H. Rai

Soundtrack

References

Films scored by Kalyanji Anandji
1960s Hindi-language films
1968 drama films
1968 films
Indian drama films
Hindi-language drama films